I'm the Law  is the title of a 30-minute syndicated American television police drama series which aired in 1953 starring George Raft as Lt. George Kirby, a New York Police Department detective involved in solving a variety of crimes in New York City.

Filming began in March 1952.

The series first aired on February 13, 1953 and ended on July 31, 1953. It was filmed at Hal Roach Studios by a production company owned by Lou Costello. Costello's brother, Pat, was the executive producer. Jean Yarbrough was the director. The series was distributed by MCA-TV.

Cast and guest stars
Besides Raft, Rochelle Hudson and Gordon Jones were members of the show's cast. Other actors seen on the program included those indicated in the table below.

Reception
The New York Times TV critic said Raft's "show is not bad at all, at least not by the TV standard for detective stories... Mr Raft is still playing Mr Raft... however his limited histrionic abilities in some way work to his advantage."

References

External links
  
 I'm the Law at CTVA

1950s American crime drama television series
1953 American television series debuts
1953 American television series endings
First-run syndicated television programs in the United States
Black-and-white American television shows